Mogini is a surname found in the Marma people and Magh people. Notable people with the surname include:

 Anuching Mogini (born 2003), Bangladeshi footballer, twin sister of Anai
 Anai Mogini (born 2003), Bangladeshi footballer

Marma people